Qalagah (also , Qalaya, Kalaga, and Kalagyakh) is a village and municipality in the Ismailli Rayon of Azerbaijan, situated 28 km to the south-west from the rayon centre, on the forepart of Ajinohur mountain. It has a population of 991.

A 1st or 2nd century-related settlement with an area of ca. 30 ha and a cemetery are near Qalagah. In 1899 a silver plate (24 cm in diameter) was also accidentally found during excavations near the village. The plate depicts a mounted Nereid, surrounded by tritons and cupids. Based on its technique and artistic characteristics, the plate is a 2nd or 3rd century example of Roman toreutics. The plate is supposed to be either a trade article of the Caucasian Albania rulers or a gift from the Roman emperors. The artifact was sent to the Imperial Archaeological Commission, then to the Hermitage Museum.

Notes

References

External links
Qalagah location info

Archaeological sites in Azerbaijan
Caucasian Albania
Populated places in Ismayilli District